Alexander Philip Wortley Allen (born 13 October 1984) is a former first-class cricketer. A wicketkeeper and right-handed batsman, he was born in Solihull, Warwickshire and played one first-class match for Warwickshire County Cricket Club in 2002. He scored an unbeaten 18 and took a catch against West Indies A and also played two List A one-day matches, for Warwickshire Cricket Board in 2002 and Devon in 2005. He played in the Minor Counties Championship for Devon from 2005 to 2007. 
His grandfather, Esmond Lewis, was also a first-class cricketer, playing 47 matches for Warwickshire after the Second World War.

References

1984 births
Living people
Warwickshire cricketers
English cricketers
Sportspeople from Solihull
Devon cricketers
Warwickshire Cricket Board cricketers
Devon cricket captains
Wicket-keepers